Sacanche District is one of six districts of the province Huallaga in Peru.

References